JDM may refer to:

Organisations
 Avions JDM, French aircraft manufacturer
 Jasubhai Digital Media, Indian publisher
 Joe Denette Motorsports
 Japanese Domestic Market, Vehicles that are created or imported from Japan.

Other uses
 Java Data Mining
 Japanese domestic market, Japan's home market for vehicles and vehicle parts
 Journal of Database Management
 Juvenile dermatomyositis, a disease